Sanblasia is a monotypic genus of plants. At present, the only species recognized is Sanblasia dressleri L.Andersson, endemic to Panamá.

References

Marantaceae
Monotypic Zingiberales genera
Endemic flora of Panama